Imre Páli (born 6 November 1909, date of death unknown) was a Hungarian field handball player who competed in the 1936 Summer Olympics. He was part of the Hungarian field handball team, which finished fourth in the Olympic tournament. He played two matches.

References

1909 births
Field handball players at the 1936 Summer Olympics
Hungarian male handball players
Olympic handball players of Hungary
Year of death missing